Marie-Françoise Peignon (1818-1876) was a French businessperson.

She was the founder of the famous masquerade costume company La maison Peignon-Costumiers (1853).

References

1818 births
1876 deaths
19th-century French businesswomen
19th-century French businesspeople